The Chevrolet HHR (an initialism for Heritage High Roof) is a retro-styled, high-roofed, five-door, five-passenger, front-wheel drive wagon  designed by Bryan Nesbitt and launched by the American automaker Chevrolet at the 2005 Los Angeles Auto Show as a 2006 model.

The HHR shares the GM Delta platform with the Chevrolet Cobalt, Pontiac G5, and Saturn Ion. Chevrolet also marketed a panel van variant of the HHR beginning in 2007.  Assembled in Ramos Arizpe, Mexico and marketed throughout North America, production of the HHR ended in May 2011. The HHR was replaced in the U.S. by the Chevrolet Captiva Sport. This was a rebadged version of the Opel Antara. However, the Captiva Sport was only available as a fleet vehicle and was not available new to the general public.

Design 

The vehicle's design was inspired by the late-1940s/early 1950s Chevrolet cars and trucks, specifically the 1947 Chevrolet Suburban and Advance Design pickups, with large, square fender flares and a hemispherical grille. The design of the HHR has been credited to Bryan Nesbitt who was a former designer at Chrysler where he was the lead designer of the Chrysler PT Cruiser. Nesbitt was recruited by GM to join its design staff and served for a time as the chief designer of the Chevrolet brand. All models had a flat-load floor (passenger models have 60/40 split bench) and fold-flat front passenger seat. For the 2007 model year, it was available in four trim levels; LS, LT, 2LT, and Special Edition. A panel van variant was also made available in 2007 for only the LT trim and became available on all trim levels in 2008. A "Half Panel" (RPO code AA5) rear quarter window delete option was available in the 2008 to 2010 model years.

Standard and optional features 
Every HHR came well-equipped with many standard features. These included power windows and door locks (front for the HHR Panel Van and front and rear for the standard HHR), dual front SRS airbags, a Driver Information Center, an A/M-F/M stereo radio with a single-disc CD/MP3 player and an auxiliary audio input jack, a four-speaker audio system, a tilt-adjustable steering wheel, keyless entry, cloth seating surfaces, a folding rear bench seat (for standard HHR models only), manually-adjustable dual (front) bucket seats, a compact spare tire and wheel, air conditioning, and a five-speed manual transmission. Upper trim levels added features such as a multifunction steering wheel, a cruise control system, aluminum-alloy wheels (which were also polished on some models), a remote vehicle starter system (for vehicles equipped with a four-speed automatic transmission only), a single-pane power moonroof, a leather-wrapped steering wheel, the OnStar in-vehicle telematics system, front side seat-mounted SRS airbags, XM satellite radio, a Bluetooth hands-free telephone system which also included OnStar, and an ABS braking system.

The HHR could also be ordered with many luxury amenities (depending upon the trim level selected), such as a power-adjustable front driver's seat, a Pioneer seven-speaker premium audio system with an external amplifier and rear cargo area-mounted subwoofer, luxury leather-trimmed seating surfaces with dual heated front seats, front-mounted fog lamps, power-adjustable and heated exterior side mirrors, and a six-disc, in-dash CD/MP3 changer with USB integration.

HHR Panel Van 
Between 2007 and 2011, Chevrolet offered a four-door panel van version of the HHR. Initially offered in LS, 1LT, and 2LT models with either a 2.2-liter or a 2.4-liter EcoTec Inline four-cylinder gasoline engine and a five-speed manual transmission, the HHR Panel Van featured a rear cargo management system in place of the standard HHR's rear split bench seat, deletion of the rear seatbelts and side SRS airbags, a plastic cargo floor in place of the standard HHR's rear carpeting, the deletion of the rear carpeted floor mats (HHR Panel Vans still included front passenger area carpeting and carpeted floor mats), and plastic panels in place of the standard HHR's rear door and quarter windows (the rear tailgate window of the standard HHR remained in place, and could still be ordered with a rear window defroster). The rear exterior door handles were removed, though the rear doors could still be opened from the interior of the vehicle. The HHR Panel Van can be distinguished from a standard HHR by a 'PANEL' emblem on the left side of the rear tailgate.

For the 2009 model year, Chevrolet introduced a Panel Van version of the HHR SS Turbocharged model, which included a 2.0L EcoTec Turbocharged Inline Four-Cylinder (I4) gasoline engine and a five-speed manual transmission. This model was only offered for a single model year, having been discontinued in 2010 along with the standard HHR SS Turbocharged model.

Assembly and sales 

The HHR was assembled in Ramos Arizpe, Mexico, and was available for sale throughout North America. The HHR was also exported to Japan by way of the motor vehicles business unit of Mitsui. First year sales exceeded 93,000 through June 2006. The HHR was partially sold in Europe and was replaced by the Chevrolet Orlando. In early 2009, the HHR was discontinued from the Mexican lineup due to poor sales.

SS Turbocharged 

In October 2006, Cheryl Catton, director of car marketing and retail integration for Chevy, confirmed that a high-performance variant of the HHR would be built. The vehicle was expected to be released with SS moniker for the 2008 model year and use the Ecotec LNF turbocharged engine found in the Pontiac Solstice GXP and Saturn Sky Red Line.

On August 16, 2007, Chevrolet officially revealed the 2008 Chevrolet HHR SS Turbocharged at the Woodward Dream Cruise in Birmingham, Michigan. It was created by GM's Performance Division and introduced as a 2008 model in the fall of 2007.

Chevrolet also introduced the HHR SS Panel Concept on October 30, 2007, at the 2007 SEMA Show. This was made into a production model for the 2009 model year.

The SS model was removed from the market after the 2010 model year due to the shuttering of the GM Performance Division, also known as the GM High Performance Vehicle Operations (HPVO) Group.  In addition, GM phased out all GM badges from the front doors for the 2010.5 model year, including the Chevrolet HHR.

In the fourth quarter of 2010, Chevrolet announced that the HHR would be discontinued after the 2011 model year, with the last HHRs available in dealerships starting in late January to early February.  HHRs were also available for fleet order until May 2011.

Year-to-year changes 
 2007: HHR Panel launched. Intended for commercial use, the rear side windows & rear seat are deleted & additional floor storage is offered. The 2.4 LE5 engine was retuned for more power while retaining the same fuel economy. The 2.2L L61 engine received some significant internal upgrades including a higher-strength Gen II block and revised cylinder head (enlarged exhaust ports) and camshaft design (increased exhaust valve duration). The engine also switched from wasted spark ignition to individual coil-on-plug ignition. Upgraded engine was controlled by new 32-bit ECM (E37). These changes increase horsepower slightly and retain similar fuel economy. Ebony interior now available.
 2008: New "SS" model introduced.  "Half Panel" RPO code AA5, rear quarter window delete, option added. Tire pressure monitoring system now standard (except in Canada). GM's OnStar was also now included with every model. Electronic stability control is available as an option. Four new exterior colors available.
 2009: Flex-Fuel (E85) was added to the 2.2 and 2.4 engines. The 2.2 engine now comes with Variable Valve Timing (VVT).The interior was slightly changed: power window control switches were relocated from the lower center dashboard to the more traditional driver-side door; interior overhead lighting was improved; AM/FM stereo with USB port was now optionally available on LT/SS models. Side curtain airbags & electronic stability control is now standard across all models (except in Canada).
 2010: GM phased out all GM badges from the front doors halfway through the model year (2010.5). 3 new paint colors added (8 total), down from 10 color options in 2009. Side curtain airbags & electronic stability control is now standard for Canadian models. Last year for "Half Panel" RPO code AA5, rear quarter window delete option. 
 2011: SS model discontinued. Cashmere interior removed from options.

Engines 

Flex-Fuel (E85) was added to the 2.2 & 2.4 engines for the 2009 model year; these were the first Four-Cylinder Flex-Fuel Engines from GM in North America.

Safety 
In Insurance Institute for Highway Safety (IIHS) tests the HHR received a "Good" overall score in the frontal offset crash test, and an "Acceptable" score in side impacts on models equipped with side curtain airbags.
Side curtain airbags became standard for 2008 models. However, side torso airbags were never made available.

Sales

See also
 Chevrolet SSR
 Chevrolet Advance Design, the 1947-55 Chevrolet pickup

References

External links 

 
 Technical Information Chevrolet HHR

HHR
Crossover sport utility vehicles
Vans
Front-wheel-drive vehicles
Retro-style automobiles
Cars introduced in 2005
2010s cars
Panel trucks